Bawwa is a village in the Nahar Block of the Rewari District in Haryana, India. Karoli, Garhs, Sihor, Bahala, Naya-Gaon, and Gadhi are the neighboring villages. Bawwa is situated approximately 3 km from Karoli mod on Kanina-Bahu-Jholri road in the Rewari District.
 
The village is well known for its fertile land. The Haryanvi dialect of Hindi is spoken locally. Religious sites near the village include Shiv Mandir, Sheetla Mata Mandir, Devi Mandir, and Shedh Bhaiya. The deity Dada Puranmal is the kuldevta of the village.

Demographics

Bawwa Village has a population of approximately 4,500. The Yadav (Ahir) caste of Tondak Gotra forms the majority of the population. Bawwa is a part of Ahirwal, the land of Ahirs. Ahirwal includes the Mahendragarh-Kanina-Narnaul area and Alwar, which also has a large population of Ahirs (Yadavs).

Geography

It borders Karoli in the south-east, Garhi in the north-east, Bahala and Naya-Gaon in the north, Sehore in the north-west and Gahra in the south-west. The temperature usually reaches  during the summer and can fall to  during the winter.

The village is adjacent to the Mahendergarh district and experiences dust storms known as Loo during the summer. Sand dunes are also found in nearby villages.

Bawwa has a dry climate, with rainfall occurring from July to September. Western Disturbance occasionally causes rain during the winter.

Economy

Farming is the principal occupation in Bawwa. Many villagers are involved in the Defense Forces as well. At least one member of a family will serve while other members of the population will serve in the local government.

Transport

Delhi Airport is approximately 120 kilometers from Bawwa via Rewari. It is a three-hour drive from Delhi Airport to Bawwa via the Delhi-Gurgaon Expressway, Gurgaon-Jaipur Highway, and Rewari-Kanina-Mahendergarh State Highway. State Highways connect Bawwa to all major towns in Haryana and adjacent districts of Rajasthan.

Bawwa is connected to Rewari by a State Highway (SH22) from Kanina, which is a major junction on the Indian railway network. Five railway lines connect it to Delhi (82 km away) and Ahmedabad on the major North-West trunk route, Bhiwani and Hissar towards Punjab, Bikaner via Kanina-Loharu-Sadulpur-Churu, Ajmer via Alwar and Jaipur and Ajmer via Ringas. The construction of a sixth railway is currently underway, which will connect Rewari to Jhajjhar and Rohtak. A planned seventh railway line, which will connect Rewari to Palwal and Khurja, has been under planning for over two decades, but has yet to be approved for construction (as of September 2010).

Bawwa is 7 km from the railway station in Kanina on the Rewari-Luharu-Sadulpur-Bikaner railway line and 17 km from the railway station in Kosli on the Rewari-Bhiwani-Hissar-Sirsa railway line. Both of these stations are connected to Delhi via Rewari.

Education

Bawwa has four schools: two government and two private. The nearby towns Kanina and Kosli have a number of schools and colleges. The closest government college is in Nahar; several private colleges, including Ahir College and Kishanlal Public (KLP) College, have also been set up in Rewari (40 km away) and Mahendergarh (25 km away), which specialize in the fields of engineering, nursing, and management, among others.

Facilities

Angan Waadi
Telephone Exchange
Mahila Mandal
Panchayat ghar
Civil hospital
Veterinary Hospital
Primary health center
Water Purification Center
Village Pond (3 Johad)
Post Office

See also

Kanina Khas
Karoli
Lookhi
Mahendragarh
Yadav
Yaduvanshi Ahirs

References

Villages in Rewari district